Crofton Robert Mudge (11 December 1920 – 29 May 1985) was an Australian rules footballer who played with St Kilda in the Victorian Football League (VFL).

Notes

External links 

1920 births
1985 deaths
Australian rules footballers from Victoria (Australia)
St Kilda Football Club players
Mordialloc Football Club players